"Soul Coaxing" or  , written in 1967 by French singer/songwriter Michel Polnareff, provided Raymond Lefèvre and His Orchestra with a 1968 instrumental hit.

Chart performance
Released in the States in January 1968, "Soul Coaxing" peaked at No. 4 on the Easy Listening chart and at No. 37 on the Billboard Hot 100, in April, near the end of its 12-week run - though it reached the Top Ten in Boston, San Francisco, Pittsburgh, Columbus and other markets.  "Soul Coaxing" debuted on Billboards Hot 100 during the five-week run at No. 1 of the instrumental smash hit "Love Is Blue (L'Amour Est Bleu)" by Paul Mauriat and His Orchestra. As with Lefèvre, Mauriat was a well-known orchestral leader in his native France.

In Britain the single was issued on the Major Minor label and in May 1968 stalled at No. 46 in the singles chart, though it served as a theme tune for certain radio stations including Chiltern Radio Supergold, Radio Caroline and Radio Luxembourg.

Other recordings
Polnareff released his original vocal version ("Âme câline") across Europe in 1967. 
In 1968, American singer Peggy March (formerly Little Peggy March) released an English-language version titled "If You Loved Me", but it failed to chart. 
Other instrumental versions were recorded by Norrie Paramor, Franck Pourcel and Sounds Orchestral.
In 1977, pioneering disco-era British-Indian musician and producer Biddu Appaiah (recording as the Biddu Orchestra) released a disco version of "Soul Coaxing".

Use in other media
BBC Radio 2 occasionally broadcasts Lefèvre's 1968 recording, particularly on its Saturday morning show Sounds of the 60s.
It is used as the hourly continuity signal on the online station Britain Radio 355.

References

1968 singles
1967 songs
Major Minor Records singles
Songs written by Michel Polnareff
1960s instrumentals